Ottenstein is a municipality in the district of Holzminden, in Lower Saxony, Germany.

See also 
 Ottenstein Plateau

References

Holzminden (district)
Duchy of Brunswick